...More Unchartered Heights of Disgrace is the sixth studio album by rock band The Dogs D'Amour, released in 1993 following the band's reformation. Guitarist Darrell Bath plays on this album in place of Jo Almeida, who later rejoined. It entered the UK Albums Chart at #30.

The album spawned two singles: "Pretty, Pretty Once" and a cover of the Small Faces track "All or Nothing", the latter of which reached #53 on the UK Singles Chart. The track "Johnny Silvers" is about guitarist Johnny Thunders, who died a couple of years prior to its release. The Dogs D'Amour had previously supported him on tour.

After the release of this album, the band decided to pursue other artistic avenues. No further album with the Dogs D'Amour name on it would be released for another seven years.

Track listing
All songs written by Tyla, except where noted.

Japanese edition bonus tracks

Chinese edition bonus tracks
 "All or nothing" - 3:51

Band
Tyla – vocals, guitars
Steve James – bass, 12-string, backing vocals
Bam – drums, percussion
Darrell Bath – guitars, slide, backing vocals

Additional musicians
Henry Twinch – hammond organ, piano and string arrangements
Ruby Turner – backing vocals on "Pretty, Pretty Once" and "Mr. Addiction"
Linda Duggan;– backing vocals on "Pretty, Pretty Once", "Mr. Addiction" and "Scared of Dying"

Singles
 All or Nothing (1993) UK #53
 Pretty, Pretty Once (1993)

1993 albums
The Dogs D'Amour albums
China Records albums